Immortal Memory  is an album by Dead Can Dance member Lisa Gerrard and Irish classical composer Patrick Cassidy, released in 2004. It was Gerrard's first studio release since 1998's Duality with Pieter Bourke.

Overview

Gerrard first met Cassidy in 2000 in Los Angeles (where he lives), when she came to work on the Gladiator soundtrack, and they planned to work together one day. When they eventually found a shared two-month break, they joined at Gerrard's Australian studio for this record.

The W. B. Yeats poem "Sailing to Byzantium" inspired the track of the same name.

The lyrics utilise three ancient languages:

 Gaelic (ancient Irish) in "The Song of Amergin" (based on the first song supposedly sung by a mortal on Irish soil).
 Aramaic in "Maranatha" (meaning "come lord, come teacher"), and "Abwoon" (meaning "our father", a rendition of the "Lord's Prayer" in the language of Jesus).
 Latin in "Psallit in Aure Dei" (meaning "singing in the ear of God", a dirge for Patrick Cassidy's late father).

Track listing

Music by Lisa Gerrard (tracks 1-9) and Patrick Cassidy (tracks 1-10).

Personnel

 Musical

 Lisa Gerrard – arranger, vocals
 Patrick Cassidy – arranger, synthesized instruments

 Technical 

 Simon Bowley – mixing
 David Badrick – mixing assistance
 Don C. Tyler – mastering
 Chris Staley – mastering assistance
 Jacek Tuschewski – technical assistance

 Graphical 

 Jacek Tuschewski – sleeve design, paintings
 Chris Bigg – sleeve design
 Mark Magidson – sleeve photography (Uluru tree)
 Greg Barrett – sleeve photography (portraits)

Notes

References
 Track-by-track commentary by Lisa Gerrard as reposted on the Lisa Gerrard Message Board (scroll down)

External links 
 

2004 albums
Lisa Gerrard albums
Patrick Cassidy (composer) albums
4AD albums